The 1969 KFK competitions in Ukraine were part of the 1969 Soviet KFK competitions that were conducted in the Soviet Union. It was 6th season of the KFK in Ukraine since its introduction in 1964.

First stage

Group 1

Group 2

Group 3

Group 4

Group 5

Group 6

Final
Final stage was taking place on 18 October – 26 October 1969 in cities of Kirovsk, Kadiivka, and Bryanka.

Promotion
None of KFK teams were promoted to the 1970 Ukrainian Class B.
 FC Shakhtar Kirovsk

However, to the Class B were promoted following teams that did not participate in the KFK competitions:
 none

References

Ukrainian Football Amateur League seasons
4
Soviet
Soviet
football